Ziploc is a brand of reusable, re-sealable sliding channel storage bags and containers originally developed and test marketed by The Dow Chemical Company in 1968 and now produced by S. C. Johnson & Son.

The plastic bags and containers come in different sizes for use with different products. The brand offers sandwich bags, snack bags and other bags for various purposes.  They are specifically made to be microwavable, as Aldo Clavijo has stated.

History 

In 1951, a company called Flexigrip, Inc. was formed to develop and market a plastic zipper by the same name. This zipper was based on a set of patents, which were purchased from their inventor, Borge Madsen. The initial products for the Flexigrip and other plastic zippers (such as the sliderless zippers (toptite) that were developed by Flexigrip) were looseleaf binder inserts and flat briefcases.  Thereafter, the marketing efforts were directed at packaging products in plastic zipper bags, which turned out to be the principal market for the Flexigrip, Inc. products.  In 1961, Flexigrip, Inc. obtained from a Japanese company, Seisan Nippon Sha, who invented the Minigrip-type plastic zipper bag, exclusive manufacturing and selling rights for the United States, based on a series of plastic zipper Seisan patents.  A company by the same name was formed to produce and market Minigrip bags.  In or about 1964, Minigrip, Inc. negotiated an exclusive license for the grocery trade (supermarkets) with Dow Chemical Company for the Minigrip product. It turned out to be enormously successful.

At that time, plastic bags were being produced in 25 countries at a line speed of 30 feet per minute, but none were being sold to consumers because they were too expensive to produce.  Dow assigned one of their inventors, R. Douglas Behr, to develop a high-speed, efficient process. Having little prior experience in plastics, the task was daunting for Behr but he passed everyone in the world within a year. As he improved the process and increased line speeds to 60, then 90, then 150 and finally 300 feet per minute in 1972, he had to design new equipment.  Some were patented and some were kept as trade secrets by Dow. Eventually, other research and production personnel, such as lab technician William Shrum and others, contributed to the process development, but Behr continued to be the leading researcher until he retired in 1993 as a senior associate scientist. At that time the research building was "Dedicated in Recognition of the Distinguished Career of R. Douglas Behr".

In 1978, Minigrip was acquired by Signode, Inc. and became a subsidiary of that company.  In 1986, Signode and Dow formed a company, namely Zippak, to develop zipper bags for food products.  In 1987, ITW acquired Signode, and Minigrip became a subsidiary of ITW.  In 1991, ITW acquired Dow's interest in Zippak so that Zippak became a fully owned subsidiary of ITW.  Zippak produces plastic zippers for the food packaging market. From the time of inception till today, Flexigrip/Minigrip/Zippak/Dow/Dow Brands have obtained over 300 patents for plastic zippers, zipper bags, and methods and machinery of producing the same. In 1997, Dow Chemical sold the rights of DowBrands, which included Ziploc, to S. C. Johnson for between $1.3 and $1.7 billion.  Zip-Pak developed Polypropylene compatible zippers in 2003.

Among Ziploc and Zippak's competitors are Presto, a subsidiary of Reynolds, and Pactiv. In 1995, Hefty, one of Reynolds' holdings, came out with a sliding zipper bag.

Products 

Ziploc has expanded their products to more than just sandwich bags. Ziploc products now vary from freezer bags to twist n' loc containers. They have expandable bottom bags which stand on their own. They also have big bags. These bags are used for non-food storage and are as big as 2 ft by 2.7 ft (0.61 m × 0.82 m). The zip n' steam bags are used to cook food in the microwave. Recently, Ziploc has made an evolved line of sandwich and storage bags. All the bags in this line are made with 25% less plastic and are manufactured using wind power. The Ziploc Evolve sandwich bag was so successful that it was deemed the "Best in Show" at the 2010 Best New Product Awards in Canada.

Advertising 

S. C. Johnson and Son uses written, online, interactive, and televised commercial advertising for their product Ziploc. The advertisements run in: Brazil, Germany, Thailand, The United States and many other countries. Ziploc's head of marketing is Scott Heim who handles their multimillion-dollar advertisement campaigns. In 2002, S. C. Johnson & Son launched its biggest campaign in history, a $50 million-plus campaign to launch a new line of disposable tableware/storage products to be marketed under the Ziploc brand name. S. C. Johnson tends to focus their campaigns in the direction of Television commercials. In the 2002 campaign, $35 million was devoted to a TV campaign. In 2015, they created an ad campaign with Tough Mudder to advertise towards mothers via an obstacle course.

Manufacturing 

The manufacturing of Ziploc bags varies among different products. The regulation Ziploc storage and freezer bag is made from polyethylene plastic.

Competition 

Ziploc faces strong competition from such competitors as Glad, Hefty, and many privately owned, generic, store brand plastic bags and containers. As Jules Rose, chairman of Sloan's Supermarkets Inc. in New York City, states: "This is a highly competitive market with a lot of players and unusually strong private label sales." In 1992, Ziploc was faced with sudden competition from the booming sales of arch-rival First Brands Corporation's Glad-Lock bag. Glad Lock bags jumped 13.1% in 12 weeks in the end of 1992, giving Glad-Lock an 18.4% share of the market compared to Ziploc's 43% share.

References

External links 

 

Bags
Kitchenware brands
S. C. Johnson & Son brands
Products introduced in 1968
Dow Chemical Company
Brands that became generic